The 2001 Basque regional election was held on Sunday, 13 May 2001, to elect the 7th Parliament of the Basque Autonomous Community. All 75 seats in the Parliament were up for election.

The PNV–EA alliance, established by the Basque Nationalist Party (PNV) and Basque Solidarity (EA) parties which had formed the Basque government since 1998, won a landslide victory with 33 seats and 42.4% of the share, which represented their best combined result in history as well as the best performance for the top voted list in a Basque regional election, outperforming the PNV's own record in 1984. The People's Party (PP), which for this election ran in coalition with Alavese Unity (UA), came second with 22.9% of the share and 19 seats, whereas the Socialist Party of the Basque Country–Basque Country Left (PSE–EE) came in third with 13 seats and 17.8% of the vote. Together, they fell well short of their intended aim of commanding an overall majority in parliament that was able to oust the ruling PNV from power, but also one seat behind the PNV–EA result. The abertzale left Basque Citizens (EH) coalition obtained 7 seats and 10.0% of the vote, in what was seen as a mix of both tactical voting in favour of the PNV–EA list as well as a punishment to the political force because of its leadership's alleged collaboration with the banned separatist group ETA.

Overview

Electoral system
The Basque Parliament was the devolved, unicameral legislature of the autonomous community of the Basque Country, having legislative power in regional matters as defined by the Spanish Constitution of 1978 and the regional Statute of Autonomy, as well as the ability to vote confidence in or withdraw it from a lehendakari.

Voting for the Parliament was on the basis of universal suffrage, which comprised all nationals over 18 years of age, registered in the Basque Country and in full enjoyment of their political rights. The 75 members of the Basque Parliament were elected using the D'Hondt method and a closed list proportional representation, with an electoral threshold of three percent of valid votes—which included blank ballots—being applied in each constituency. Seats were allocated to constituencies, corresponding to the provinces of Álava, Biscay and Guipúzcoa, being allocated a fixed number of 25 seats each to provide for an equal representation of the three provinces in parliament as required under the regional statute of autonomy. This meant that Álava was allocated the same number of seats as Biscay and Gipuzkoa, despite their populations being, as of 1 January 2001: 285,198, 1,124,445 and 673,328, respectively.

The use of the D'Hondt method might result in a higher effective threshold, depending on the district magnitude.

Election date
The term of the Basque Parliament expired four years after the date of its previous election, unless it was dissolved earlier. The election Decree was required to be issued no later than the twenty-fifth day prior to the date of expiry of parliament and published on the following day in the Official Gazette of the Basque Country, with election day taking place on the fifty-fourth day from publication. The previous election was held on 25 October 1998, which meant that the legislature's term would have expired on 25 October 2002. The election decree was required to be published in the BOPV no later than 1 October 2002, with the election taking place on the fifty-fourth day from publication, setting the latest possible election date for the Parliament on Sunday, 24 November 2002.

The lehendakari had the prerogative to dissolve the Basque Parliament at any given time and call a snap election, provided that no motion of no confidence was in process. In the event of an investiture process failing to elect a lehendakari within a sixty-day period from the Parliament re-assembly, the Parliament was to be dissolved and a fresh election called.

Parties and candidates
The electoral law allowed for parties and federations registered in the interior ministry, coalitions and groupings of electors to present lists of candidates. Parties and federations intending to form a coalition ahead of an election were required to inform the relevant Electoral Commission within ten days of the election call, whereas groupings of electors needed to secure the signature of at least one percent of the electorate in the constituencies for which they sought election, disallowing electors from signing for more than one list of candidates.

Below is a list of the main parties and electoral alliances which contested the election:

Opinion polls
The table below lists voting intention estimates in reverse chronological order, showing the most recent first and using the dates when the survey fieldwork was done, as opposed to the date of publication. Where the fieldwork dates are unknown, the date of publication is given instead. The highest percentage figure in each polling survey is displayed with its background shaded in the leading party's colour. If a tie ensues, this is applied to the figures with the highest percentages. The "Lead" column on the right shows the percentage-point difference between the parties with the highest percentages in a poll. When available, seat projections determined by the polling organisations are displayed below (or in place of) the percentages in a smaller font; 38 seats were required for an absolute majority in the Basque Parliament.

Results

Overall

Distribution by constituency

Aftermath

Notes

References
Opinion poll sources

Other

2001 in the Basque Country (autonomous community)
Basque Country
Regional elections in the Basque Country (autonomous community)
May 2001 events in Europe